Marie Dominique Luizet (1852–1930) was a French botanist and chemist.  He was the first to identify several species of Saxifraga.

References

1852 births
1930 deaths
19th-century French scientists
19th-century French chemists
19th-century French botanists
20th-century French chemists